The family Fringillidae are the "true" finches. The International Ornithological Committee (IOC) recognizes these 234 species in the family, distributed among three subfamilies and 50 genera. Confusingly, only 74 of the species include "finch" in their common names, and several other families include species called finches. This list includes 18 extinct species, the Bonin grosbeak and 17 Hawaiian honeycreepers; they are marked (X).

This list is presented according to the IOC taxonomic sequence and can also be sorted alphabetically by common name and binomial.

References

Fringillidae
Fringillidae